Joseph Williams (December 8, 1801 – March 31, 1870) was a chief justice of the Iowa Supreme Court. He served the court during Iowa's time as a territory. He was the state's second and fourth chief justice.

References

1801 births
1870 deaths
People from Muscatine County, Iowa
Justices of the Iowa Supreme Court
Chief Justices of the Iowa Supreme Court
19th-century American judges